Rose Butler Jackson is an Australian Labor Party politician serving as a Member of the New South Wales Legislative Council since 8 May 2019. She is a former Secretary of the New South Wales Labor Left faction and the former Assistant General Secretary of NSW Labor. Jackson is a left member of NSW Labor calling on the party to legalise cannabis and drug law reform. Jackson has also called for strong industrial relations reform, like criminalising wage theft, and criminal justice reform in NSW.

Early life and education
Jackson is the daughter of the late Australian Broadcasting Corporation journalist Liz Jackson and film maker Martin Butler.

Jackson grew up in the Eastern Suburbs of Sydney, attended Newtown High School of the Performing Arts and graduated with a Bachelor of Economic and Social Sciences and a Bachelor of Laws from the University of Sydney.

Student politics 
Jackson was heavily involved in Labor Left student politics. She was originally a member of the Sydney University Socialist Left faction, which was an affiliate of the National Organisation of Labor Students (NOLS). In 2005 she served as President of the University of Sydney Students' Representative Council, where she gained national prominence for her part in organising the student campaign against the Howard government's Voluntary student unionism laws.

In 2006 Jackson successfully advocated to re-unify both major Labor Left student factions, NOLS and the Victorian-based Australian Labor Students, and subsequently became the first National Labor Students President of the National Union of Students.

After her involvement in student politics, she became the President of Young Labor Left and a member of the Young Labor State Executive. During this time she worked as a political staffer for state Minister for Education Verity Firth.

Career
For the 2007 Federal Election, Rose was the campaign manager for Labor's Candidate for the marginal Sydney seat of Wentworth, George Newhouse.

On 21 November 2007, it was alleged Jackson had "espoused anti-Zionism" during her tenure in the NUS. The Australian reported on its front page a leaked email which Jackson had addressed to "Dear Activists", stating "I oppose Zionism because it calls for the creation of a Jewish state, and I think all governments should be secular". The incident attracted significant media coverage because of Jackson's role as a staffer for candidate George Newhouse whose electorate of Wentworth has the highest Jewish population of any in Australia. The Australian Jewish News said Jackson's comments "attacked the heart and soul of every Jewish voter". Jackson said she had not understood the definition of Zionism at the time she wrote the email, saying "I support Israel."

In September 2008, Jackson was elected as a Councillor to Waverley local council. She also gained media attention in 2008 following her appearance on the ABC's Q&A program during which she confused the concept of Pavlovian conditioning for pavlova, a type of dessert.

Jackson served as the National Political Coordinator of left-wing trade union United Voice until 2013, when she moved to a role as a campaign organiser at NSW Labor Office. She was the Secretary of the Labor Left faction from 2010 until 2016 and has been an Assistant General Secretary of NSW Labor and State Convenor of the New South Wales Labor Left faction since 2016.

Jackson was selected to fill the casual vacancy in the NSW state upper house, the NSW Legislative Council following Lynda Voltz's election to the NSW Legislative Assembly for the seat of Auburn and was appointed on 8 May 2019.

In 2020 Jackson called for an end to the private prison system in NSW and criticised past Governments for privatising prisons.

In 2020 Jackson publicly announced her support for the legalisation of cannabis in NSW. Jackson was the first NSW Labor MPs to support the legalisation of cannabis after the ACT legalised cannabis.

On 11 June 2021 Rose was appointed as the Shadow Minister for Water, Housing and Homelessness. As the responsible Shadow Minister, Jackson opposed a motion moved by the NSW Greens which would have temporarily banned the eviction of tenants in coastal communities during the COVID-19 Crisis. Jackson supported a Coalition amendment to the Greens' proposal which removed the proposal to ban evictions in coastal areas on the basis that restricting the rights of landlords would "throw that market into chaos weeks before the holiday season".

Jackson supported the controversial Roads and Crimes Legislation Amendment Bill 2022 which made it an offence for protestors to cause "damage or disruption to major roads or major public facilities". The Coalition Government introduced the Bill in light of the increased use of non-violent direct action by members of Blockade Australia to disrupt logistics infrastructure at Port Botany.  Under the new legislation, individuals found guilty of disrupting 'major roads' or 'major infrastructure' are liable for fines of up to $22,000 "or imprisonment for 2 years, or both".  In her Second Reading speech, Jackson argued that the new criminal penalties were necessary "...to target rogue individuals who completely disrupt peak hour traffic on the Spit Bridge, [and] on our ports...". Jackson supported the legislation despite widespread opposition from civil liberties organisations including Amnesty International, The Australian Youth Climate Coalition, The Human Rights Law Centre, Environmental Defender's Office NSW, and the NSW Council for Civil Liberties.

References

Australian activists
Living people
Politicians from Sydney
Australian feminists
Labor Left politicians
Year of birth missing (living people)
People educated at Newtown High School of the Performing Arts
Waverley Council
Women local councillors in Australia
Australian Labor Party councillors
Members of the New South Wales Legislative Council
Women members of the New South Wales Legislative Council
Australian Labor Party members of the Parliament of New South Wales
21st-century Australian politicians
21st-century Australian women politicians